Adam Wilson (1814–1891) was a Canadian lawyer, judge, political figure and former mayor of Toronto.

Adam Wilson may also refer to:
Adam Wilson (musician), bass player for Thirteen Senses
Adam Wilson (The Young and the Restless), a fictional character from The Young and the Restless, also known as Adam Newman